"Stand Back" is a song by American singer-songwriter Stevie Nicks from her second solo studio album The Wild Heart (1983). The song was released as the lead single from the album in May 1983 and reached number five on the Billboard Hot 100 and number two on the Top Mainstream Rock Tracks chart in August of that year. "Stand Back" has been a staple in Nicks' live shows since its pre-album debut at the 1983 US Festival, and it has also been included in the Fleetwood Mac tour set lists since 1987.

In the United Kingdom, the single was Nicks' first 12" release, featuring a different glossy picture sleeve and the inclusion of a third track, "Wild Heart". A 12" promotional single was also released to United States radio stations in 1983, featuring a full-colour sleeve, but playing the standard album version (in mono and stereo) on both sides.

Background and composition
Nicks has often told the story of how she wrote "Stand Back". She wrote it on the day of her marriage to Kim Anderson on January 29, 1983. The newlyweds were driving up to San Ysidro Ranch in Santa Barbara when Prince's song "Little Red Corvette" came on the radio. Nicks started humming along to the melody, especially inspired by the lush synthesizers on the song, and "Stand Back" was born. The couple stopped and got a tape recorder and Nicks recorded the demo in the honeymoon suite that night. Later, when Nicks went into the studio to record the song, she called Prince and told him the story of how she wrote the song to his melody. On the night of February 8, 1983, Prince came to the studio and played synthesizers on it, although his contribution is uncredited on the album. He and Nicks did agree however to split the publishing royalties on the song 50-50. Then, she says, "he just got up and left as if the whole thing happened in a dream." 

Synth player Dave Bluefield (who also programmed the song's rhythm on a drum machine) revealed that while he played the main chords on the song (using an Oberheim OB-Xa synthesizer), Prince did the "8th note up beats" in the upper octaves during the choruses (first heard at the 0:54 mark - supposedly played with just two fingers). It's possible that Prince played other synth parts that didn't make the final mix.

There were two mixes made of the song: the generally more well-known album version (4:48) and the edited single version (4:18). Differences between the two are somewhat subtle, but the single version tends to have more of a "collapsed" or "mono" sound to it and the electronic drum programs are mixed rather dry and flattened, especially in the song's intro bars; whereas the drum tracks on the album version are accentuated by a generous amount of reverb effect and harder compression. Acoustic drums were given a more backseat role on "Stand Back". There is a further "polished" version of the track, with crisper percussion and louder foreground synth, featured on Nicks' 1991 compilation album Timespace: The Best of Stevie Nicks, remixed by Chris Lord-Alge with a run time of 4:59.

“Stand Back” is performed in the key of B minor with a tempo of 116 beats per minute in common time. The song follows a chord progression of A/G – G – D/A – A – D/A – G/B – Bm – A/B – B/D – G, and Nicks’ vocals span from A3 to B4.

Reception
Cash Box said it represents "both familiar and challenging listening," combining Nicks' traditional "vamp posture" with dance music.

Music video
Two music videos were filmed for the single. The first, which was never aired and is referred to as the "Scarlett Version", was a lavish production directed by Brian Grant and features Nicks in a Gone with the Wind type scenario. Upon seeing the completed video, Nicks rejected it as, according to Grant, she felt she looked fat. This version can now be found (with Nicks' commentary) on the DVD supplement of her 2007 collection Crystal Visions – The Very Best of Stevie Nicks.

As an alternative, a second video was made on a much lower budget than the original. Directed by choreographer Jeffrey Hornaday, it features Nicks performing the song behind a microphone in a spotlight-filled room surrounded by glass walls and mirrors, interspersed with shots of choreographed dance sequences. This was the version aired on television and was also included on Nicks' 1986 video compilation I Can't Wait - The Video Collection as well as the aforementioned Crystal Visions compilation DVD.

Live performances
Nicks performed the song as the musical guest on the December 10, 1983 Saturday Night Live episode, with Liberty DeVitto of Billy Joel fame on drums and Marilyn Martin singing backup.

One live performance of the song in Nicks' solo shows is captured in the 2009 CD release The Soundstage Sessions, where Nicks chose the track as the opening number to her show, rather than placing it towards the climactic end of the setlist as per previous tours.

Performances with Fleetwood Mac
Nicks began performing "Stand Back" with Fleetwood Mac on the band's 1987 tour. It is included on the Fleetwood Mac live concert video Tango in the Night (recorded in December 1987) and a (slightly extended) audio version from the same show is included in the 4-disc boxed set 25 Years – The Chain. Since then, the song has been performed on every Fleetwood Mac tour (with the exception of the On with the Show Tour) Nicks has been a part of, including the Behind the Mask tour in 1990, The Dance reunion tour in 1997, the Say You Will tour in 2003 (it is featured in the 2004 CD/DVD set Fleetwood Mac: Live in Boston), the 2009 Unleashed Tour, as well as the band's 2013 world tour.

Legacy
Sky Ferreira and Rod Stewart have performed cover versions of the song. Additionally, the song was sampled in the song "No Way to Hide" by German techno band Scooter, which was featured on their 2012 album "Music for a Big Night Out".

Credits and personnel
Stevie Nicks – vocals
Jimmy Iovine – producer
David Williams – guitar
Sandy Stewart – synthesizer
Prince - synthesizer
Bobbye Hall – percussion
Waddy Wachtel – guitar
Ian Wallace – percussion
Russ Kunkel – drum overdubs
Steve Lukather – guitar
Marvin Caruso – drums
David Bluefield – OB-Xa synthesizer and DMX drum machine programming
Sharon Celani – background vocals
Lori Perry-Nicks – background vocals
Shelly Yakus – engineer
Chris Lord-Alge – mixer

Charts

Weekly charts

Year-end charts

Linus Loves version
In 2003, Scottish electronic music duo Linus Loves released a cover of "Stand Back" with vocals by Sam Obernik. This version reached No. 31 on the UK Singles Chart and No. 73 on the Australian ARIA Charts.

Crystal Visions version

The song was remixed and released again as a single on August 28, 2007 to promote Nicks' compilation album Crystal Visions – The Very Best of Stevie Nicks. This time the single went to number two on the US Dance Club Songs chart and number-one on the Hot Dance Single Sales chart.

Charts

Year-end charts

Notes and references

Timespace – The Best of Stevie Nicks, liner notes
''Crystal Visions – The Very Best of Stevie Nicks, liner notes and commentary

1983 songs
1983 singles
2003 singles
Stevie Nicks songs
Songs written by Stevie Nicks
Song recordings produced by Jimmy Iovine
Reprise Records singles
Modern Records (1980) singles